Mooring is a surname. Notable people with the surname include:

George Mooring (1908 1969), British civil servant
Jim Mooring (1917–2007), Australian rules footballer
Johnny Mooring (1927–1974), Canadian singer-songwriter
Leeland Dayton Mooring (born 1988), American singer, member of the Christian band Leeland
Jack Anthony Mooring and Shelly Mooring, also members of the Christian band Leeland
Jeff Mooring, American actor
John Mooring, American football tackle and center